Wasena Historic District is a national historic district located in the Wasena neighborhood of Roanoke, Virginia.  It encompasses 574 contributing buildings, 1 contributing site, 3 contributing structures, and 3 contributing objects.  It is a primarily residential district with single-family dwellings.  Also in the district are a few commercial buildings, several industrial buildings, a park along the river and the bridge.  The houses range in date from the early 1900s through the 1950s.  The American Craftsman-style bungalow is the dominant style and form followed by the
American Foursquare (including Colonial Revival and Prairie style) and the Ranch style.  The oldest house is the Howbert House at 918 Howbert Avenue, built about 1900.

It was listed on the National Register of Historic Places in 2012.

References

Historic districts on the National Register of Historic Places in Virginia
Colonial Revival architecture in Virginia
Buildings and structures in Roanoke, Virginia
National Register of Historic Places in Roanoke, Virginia